The 17 August 2005 Baghdad bombings was a terrorist attack that occurred when three powerful car bombs ripped through civilian targets in central Baghdad, killing 43 people and injuring 76.

External links 

Triple Baghdad blasts kill dozens – BBC News

2005 murders in Iraq
21st-century mass murder in Iraq
Terrorist incidents in Iraq in 2005
Terrorist incidents in Baghdad
Car and truck bombings in Iraq
Mass murder in 2005
2000s in Baghdad
August 2005 events in Iraq